The 1892 Centre football team represented Centre College as an independent during the 1892 college football season. Led by second-year head coach W. Durant Berry, Centre compiled a record of 6–0.

Schedule

References

Centre
Centre Colonels football seasons
College football undefeated seasons
Centre football